Philothée O'Neddy (1811-1875), real name Théophile Dondey de Santeny, was a French poet. He was an associate of the Romantic movement, and one of the original "Bohemians". He is known for his 1833 collection Feu et flamme. He also wrote fiction, such as Histoire d' un anneau enchanté (1842).

1811 births
1875 deaths
French poets
French literary critics
French male poets
French male short story writers
19th-century French poets
19th-century French short story writers
19th-century French male writers
French male non-fiction writers